Siimes is a surname. Notable people with the surname include:

Pentti Siimes (1929–2016), Finnish actor
Suvi-Anne Siimes (born 1963), Finnish politician